"Side of a Bullet" is Nickelback's seventh and final single from the album All the Right Reasons. The song was released only to U.S. rock stations. "Side of a Bullet" charted on the U.S. Mainstream Rock Chart, peaking at number 7, giving Nickelback their fourth top-ten hit on the chart from All the Right Reasons.

Background 
The song is a tribute to Dimebag Darrell who was shot and killed on stage while performing in Columbus, Ohio, with Damageplan. It features aggressive guitars and double bass drumming. The lyrics for "Side of a Bullet" focus on the murder of Darrell, the anger at the perpetrator Nathan Gale and the aftermath thereof. The guitar solo combines outtakes by Darrell originally meant to be used on the Pantera albums Vulgar Display of Power and Far Beyond Driven. Darrell's girlfriend Rita Haney and his brother Vinnie Paul gave Nickelback permission to use the outtakes. At first Nickelback wanted to have Vinnie Paul playing on the track but he declined by stating that Nickelback's drummer Daniel Adair performed just as well as he could.

Track listing

Personnel 

Nickelback
 Chad Kroeger – lead vocals, lead guitar
 Ryan Peake – rhythm guitar, backing vocals
 Mike Kroeger – bass, backing vocals
 Daniel Adair – drums, backing vocals

Musicians
 Dimebag Darrell – guitar solo (sample) on "Side of a Bullet"

Technical
 Ryan Andersen – digital editing
 Richard Beland – photography
 Zach Blackstone – mixing assistance
 Kevin Estrada – photography
 Ted Jensen – mastering
 Joey Moi – production, engineering, digital editing
 Randy Staub – mixing

Charts

References 

2005 songs
2007 singles
Nickelback songs
Songs written by Chad Kroeger
Songs written by Daniel Adair
Songs written by Mike Kroeger
Songs written by Dimebag Darrell
Commemoration songs
Pantera
Heavy metal songs
Roadrunner Records singles